Allbo Hundred, or Allbo härad, was a hundred of Småland in Sweden.

Sockens
Allbo Hundred contained 16 sockens:

See also
Albo Hundred in Scania

Hundreds of Småland